Brandin Tawan Cooks (born September 25, 1993) is an American football wide receiver for the Dallas Cowboys of the National Football League (NFL). He played college football at Oregon State, where he received consensus All-American honors, and was selected by the New Orleans Saints in the first round of the 2014 NFL Draft. After three seasons with New Orleans, Cooks played one season for the New England Patriots and two seasons for the Los Angeles Rams before joining the Houston Texans in 2020.

Early life
Cooks was born in Stockton, California to Worth Cooks Sr. and Andrea Cooks on September 25, 1993. Worth Sr. died of a heart attack when Brandin was six years old and Cooks and his three brothers, Fred, Worth Jr., and Andre, were thereafter raised by their mother. He attended Lincoln High School in Stockton, where he played high school football for the Trojans. As a sophomore, he recorded 29 receptions for 600 yards and seven touchdowns. As a junior, he had 46 receptions for 783 yards and 10 touchdowns, while also collecting three interceptions on the defensive side of the ball. As a senior, he had 66 receptions for 1,125 yards and 11 touchdowns. Cooks was ranked by the Rivals.com recruiting network as the 26th-best wide receiver and the 240th overall prospect in his class. He originally committed to play college football at the UCLA but changed to Oregon State University. In addition to football, Cooks played basketball and ran track in high school.

College career
Cooks played at Oregon State from 2011 to 2013 under head coach Mike Riley.

2011 season
Cooks made an immediate impact for Oregon State in their 3–9 season. Cooks recorded three receptions for 26 yards in the 29–28 loss in his collegiate debut against Sacramento State. On October 15, against BYU, he had three receptions for 90 yards and his first collegiate receiving touchdown, which came on a 59-yard reception from quarterback Sean Mannion, in the 38–28 loss. He played in all 12 games with three starts and recorded 31 receptions for 391 yards and three touchdowns. In addition, he returned kickoffs, averaging 22.4 yards per return on eight attempts.

2012 season
Cooks started his sophomore season with six receptions for 80 yards and a touchdown in a 10–7 victory over Wisconsin. Two weeks later, against UCLA, he had six receptions for 175 yards and a touchdown in the 27–20 victory. In the following game against Arizona, he had nine receptions for 149 yards in the 38–35 victory. On October 13, against BYU, he had eight receptions for 173 yards in the 42–24 victory.
On October 27, against Washington, he had nine receptions for 123 yards and a touchdown in the 20–17 loss. On November 3, against Arizona State, he had six receptions for 116 yards in the 36–26 victory. Overall, he had 67 receptions for 1,151 yards and five touchdowns. The combination of Cooks and Markus Wheaton created one of the most dynamic receiving duos in college football and Oregon State history. The two players combined for 158 receptions, 2,395 yards, and 16 touchdowns in the 2012 season as Oregon State improved from the previous season to a 9–4 record.

2013 season
Cooks started the 2013 season with 13 receptions for 196 yards and two touchdowns in the 49–46 loss to Eastern Washington. In the next game, against Hawaii, he had seven receptions for 92 yards and two touchdowns in the 33–14 victory. One week later, against Utah, he had nine receptions for 210 yards and three touchdowns in the 51–48 victory. The performance marked his only game as a Beaver with three receiving touchdowns. In the following game against San Diego State, he had a collegiate career-high 14 receptions for 141 yards in the 34–30 victory. His 14 receptions tied a school single-game record with Mike Hass and Isaiah Hodgins.  He continued to perform well with nine receptions for 168 yards and two touchdowns against Colorado in the next game, a 44–17 victory. Cooks started October with 11 receptions for 137 yards and two touchdowns against Washington State in the 52–24 victory. In the following week against California, he had 13 receptions for a collegiate career-high 232 yards and a touchdown in the 49–17 victory. His 232 receiving yards were the second-most in a game in school history, behind Mike Hass's 293 against Boise State in 2004. In the next two games, against Stanford and USC, he had receiving touchdowns in both games. On November 23, against Washington, he had 10 receptions for 117 yards and a touchdown in the 69–27 loss. In the regular season finale against Oregon, he had ten receptions for 110 yards in the 36–35 loss. Oregon State finished with a 6–6 record and qualified for the Hawaii Bowl. Against Boise State, he had eight receptions for 60 yards and a touchdown in the 38–23 victory.

Cooks finished the 2013 season with 128 receptions for 1,730 yards and 16 touchdowns. Cooks's receptions and receiving yards were Pac-12 records. His 128 receptions shattered the school single-season record, previously held by James Rodgers and Markus Wheaton with 91 each.  He was held to under 100 yards only four times and exceeded 200 yards in a game twice. At the end of the season, he won the Fred Biletnikoff Award and was a consensus All-American. He was the second Oregon State player to win the Biletnikoff Award, the first being Mike Hass in 2005. He finished his collegiate career among the best in school history by being second in receptions, third in receiving yards, and first in receiving touchdowns. Cooks and quarterback Sean Mannion teamed up for 23 receiving touchdowns over their careers, a school record for a quarterback-receiver tandem.

On January 2, 2014, Cooks announced that he would forgo his senior season and enter the 2014 NFL Draft.

In addition to football, Cooks ran track at Oregon State. He earned a second-place finish in the 60-meter dash at the 2012 UW Invitational, clocking a personal-best time of 6.81 seconds.

College statistics

Collegiate awards and honors
 Biletnikoff Award (2013)
 Consensus All-American (2013)
 Hawaii Bowl Champion (2013)
 First-team All-Pac-12 (2013)
 All-Pac-12 Honorable Mention (2012)
 Pac-12 record for most receiving yards in a single season (2013)
 1st all-time career receiving touchdowns at Oregon State (24 touchdowns)
 3rd all-time career receiving yards at Oregon State (3,272 yards)
 2013 NCAA leader in receiving yards (1,730 yards) 
 2013 Pac-12 leader in receiving touchdowns (16 touchdowns)
 2013 Pac-12 leader in receptions (128 receptions)
 2012 Pac-12 leader in yards per reception (17.2 yards)

Professional career

New Orleans Saints
Cooks was selected by the New Orleans Saints as the 20th overall pick of the first round of the 2014 NFL Draft; the Saints traded up from the 27th spot, giving their first and third-round picks to the Arizona Cardinals in return for Arizona's first-round pick, in order to get Cooks. Cooks was the highest drafted player out of Oregon State since Ken Carpenter went 13th overall in the first round of the 1950 NFL Draft. In addition, he was the highest drafted wide receiver in school history.

2014 season: Rookie year
On May 18, 2014, the Saints signed Cooks to a four-year contract worth $8.3 million.

In his first NFL game, Cooks caught seven passes for 77 yards and a touchdown and had an 18-yard rush in a 37–34 overtime road loss to the Atlanta Falcons. This made Cooks the youngest player, at 20 years and 347 days, to catch a touchdown pass since Reidel Anthony caught one against the Miami Dolphins on September 28, 1997, at 20 years and 343 days. During Week 8 against the Green Bay Packers, Cooks recorded six catches for 94 yards and a touchdown to go along with a four-yard rushing touchdown in the 44–23 road victory. Two weeks later against the San Francisco 49ers, he caught five passes for 90 yards and a touchdown in the 27–24 loss. In the next game against the Cincinnati Bengals, Cooks had to leave the eventual 27–10 defeat with an injury. It was later revealed that he broke his thumb, prematurely ending his rookie season.

Cooks finished his rookie season with 53 receptions for 550 yards and three touchdowns to go along with seven carries for 73 yards and a touchdown in 10 games and seven starts as the Saints went 7–9.

2015 season

Cooks began the 2015 season as the number-one wide receiver for the Saints. In the first four games of the season, he totaled 20 receptions for 215 yards as the team started 1–3. Cooks caught for over 100 yards in a game for the first time in his career in the Week 5 game against the Philadelphia Eagles, where he had five catches for 107 yards and a touchdown in the 39–17 loss. Three weeks later, Cooks caught six passes for 88 yards and two touchdowns in a 52–49 victory over the New York Giants. His two touchdowns were part of a record-tying seven touchdowns thrown by Drew Brees. In Week 10, Cooks had five passes for 98 yards and two touchdowns along with an 11-yard rush during a 47–14 loss to the Washington Redskins. During Week 13, he recorded six receptions for 104 yards and a touchdown in a 41–38 loss against the Carolina Panthers. In Weeks 15 and 16 combined, Cooks had 15 catches for 247 yards and two touchdowns against the Detroit Lions and Jacksonville Jaguars. The Saints finished with a 7–9 record and missed the playoffs

Cooks finished his second professional season with 84 catches for 1,138 yards and nine touchdowns in 16 games and 12 starts, leading the Saints in all of those categories.

2016 season
Before the 2016 season, Cooks was pegged as a breakout candidate by ESPN. He lived up to the pre-season hype when he had six receptions for 143 yards and two touchdowns and an 11-yard rush during the season-opening 35–34 loss against the Oakland Raiders. He caught a 98-yard touchdown pass in the third quarter to set the Saints' franchise record for the longest play from scrimmage. Cooks, along with Willie Snead IV and rookie Michael Thomas, finished the day with 373 receiving yards combined, the most ever by a New Orleans trio in a loss. During Week 6 against the Carolina Panthers, Cooks had seven passes for 173 yards, which included a 87-yard touchdown reception, in the 41–38 victory. After a Week 12 49–21 win over the Los Angeles Rams, in which he was not targeted for a single pass, Cooks voiced his frustration by saying, "Closed mouths don't get fed." During a Week 15 48–41 road victory against the Arizona Cardinals, he caught seven passes for a career-high 186 yards and two touchdowns, one for 65 yards and one for 45 yards. The Saints finished with a 7–9 record and missed the playoffs.

Cooks finished the 2016 season catching 78 receptions for a then career-high in receiving yards with 1,173 and eight touchdowns in 16 games and 12 starts. He finished seventh in the NFL in receiving yards. Despite the fact that his targets dropped from 129 in 2015 to 117 in 2016, his 10.0 yards per target ranked sixth among NFL wide receivers.

New England Patriots
On March 10, 2017, the New England Patriots traded their 2017 first-round (used on Ryan Ramczyk) and third-round draft picks (one was originally acquired from the Cleveland Browns in exchange for Jamie Collins) to the Saints for Cooks and a 2017 fourth-round draft pick. On April 29, 2017, the Patriots picked up the fifth-year option on Cooks' contract.

During a Week 3 36–33 victory over the Houston Texans, Cooks had five receptions for 131 yards and scored his first two touchdowns as a Patriot, including a 25-yard game winner with 23 seconds left; after the game-winning touchdown, he scored on the ensuing two-point conversion. In Week 11 against the Oakland Raiders at Estadio Azteca, he had six receptions for 149 yards and a season long 64-yard touchdown in a 33–8 victory. 

Cooks finished his only season with the Patriots with 65 receptions for 1,082 yards and seven touchdowns in 16 games and 15 starts. In addition, he rushed nine times for 40 yards. Cooks and Rob Gronkowski combined to form a 1,000-yard receiving duo for the Patriots, which was their first since 2011. Cooks finished second on the team to Gronkowski in receptions, receiving yards, and receiving touchdowns on the season.

The Patriots finished atop the AFC East with a 13–3 record and earned the #1-seed in the AFC. In the Divisional Round against the Tennessee Titans, Cooks caught three passes for 32 yards in the 35–14 victory. In the AFC Championship game against the Jacksonville Jaguars, he had six receptions for 100 yards in the 24–20 victory. During Super Bowl LII against the Philadelphia Eagles, he caught a 23-yard reception and had a one-yard rush, but left the game early in the second quarter with a concussion after getting tackled by Eagles safety Malcolm Jenkins. He was placed on concussion protocol and took no further part in the Super Bowl as the Patriots lost by a score of 41–33.

Los Angeles Rams
On April 3, 2018, the New England Patriots traded Cooks and a fourth-round draft pick to the Los Angeles Rams for a first-round pick (used on Isaiah Wynn) and a sixth-round pick. On July 17, 2018, Cooks signed a five-year, $81 million extension with the Rams with $50.5 million guaranteed.

2018 season
In Week 2 against the Arizona Cardinals, Cooks had seven receptions for a season-high 159 yards in the 34–0 shutout victory. Two weeks later against the Minnesota Vikings, Cooks had seven receptions for 116 yards and a touchdown along with a 10-yard rush in the 38–31 victory. In Week 9, against his former team, the New Orleans Saints, Cooks caught six receptions for 114 yards and a touchdown in the 45–35 road loss. In the next game against the Seattle Seahawks, he had another great outing, catching ten passes for 100 yards and rushing for a nine-yard touchdown in a 36–31 victory. During Week 11 against the Kansas City Chiefs, Cooks caught eight passes for 107 yards in the narrow 54–51 victory. In one of the highest-scoring back-and-forth games in NFL history, Cooks helped convert a key first down on a 22-yard reception on the drive that put the Rams up for good. After a Week 12 bye, the Rams went on the road to face the Detroit Lions. In the 30–16 road victory, he eclipsed 1,000 receiving yards on the season. In the process, Cooks became the first player in NFL history with 1,000 receiving yards in three consecutive seasons with three different teams.

Cooks finished the regular season with 80 receptions for a career-high 1,204 yards and five touchdowns in 16 games and starts. He also rushed 10 times for 68 yards and a rushing touchdown.

The Rams finished atop the NFC West and earned the #2-seed for the NFC Playoffs. In the Divisional Round against the Dallas Cowboys, Cooks recorded four catches for 65 yards and a five-yard rush in a 30–22 victory. In the NFC Championship Game against the Saints, Cooks had seven receptions for 107 yards in a 26–23 overtime road victory to reach Super Bowl LIII. It was his second straight Super Bowl appearance and the Rams faced off against Cooks' former team, the New England Patriots. In the Super Bowl, Cooks caught eight passes for 120 yards, but the Rams lost 13–3 in the lowest-scoring Super Bowl in history. Cooks had three chances at scoring pivotal receiving touchdowns in the game. On the first attempt, Cooks was wide open in the endzone and the play was broken up by Jason McCourty at the end. The second was a drop by Cooks in the endzone when the Rams were trailing by seven with over four minutes left. The last occurred on the next play when Goff threw a pressured pass to Cooks that ended up being under thrown and picked off by Stephon Gilmore.

2019 season
In Week 3 against the Cleveland Browns, Cooks caught eight passes for 112 yards and had an eight-yard rush in the 20–13 road victory on NBC Sunday Night Football. During a narrow Week 5 30–29 road loss against the Seattle Seahawks on Thursday Night Football, Cooks had to leave the game to be evaluated for a concussion. Three weeks later against the Cincinnati Bengals in London, he suffered a concussion after taking a helmet-to-helmet hit from Jessie Bates during the first quarter. The Rams went on to win 24–10 and Cooks missed the next two games due to the concussion. He returned in Week 12 against the Baltimore Ravens.

Cooks finished the 2019 season with 42 receptions for 583 yards and two touchdowns in 14 games and starts, all his lowest totals since his rookie season in 2014. The Rams went 9–7 but missed the playoffs.

Houston Texans
On April 10, 2020, Cooks and a 2022 fourth-round draft pick were traded to the Houston Texans in exchange for the Texans second-round draft pick, which was later used on Van Jefferson, in the 2020 NFL Draft.

2020 season
During Week 5 against the Jacksonville Jaguars, Cooks recorded eight catches for 161 yards and his first touchdown as a Texan during the 30–14 win. During Week 16 against the Cincinnati Bengals, Cooks recorded seven catches for 141 yards and a touchdown during the 37–31 loss. In the regular-season finale against the Tennessee Titans, he had 11 receptions for 166 yards and two touchdowns in the 41–38 loss.

Cooks finished the 2020 season with 81 receptions for 1,150 yards and six touchdowns as the Texans went 4–12. He joined Brandon Marshall as the only players in NFL history to record a 1,000-yard receiving season with four different teams.

2021 season
Cooks entered the season as a starting wide receiver for the Texans. He started the season with five receptions for a season-high 132 receiving yards in a 37–21 victory over the Jacksonville Jaguars. Over the course of the season, he was a very consistent option for the 3–14 Texans, totalling eight games with over five receptions, four total games with at least 100 receiving yards and five games with at least one touchdown. He finished the season as the team's leading receiver in all major statistical categories, recording a career-high 90 catches with 1,037 yards and six touchdowns. He became the third player in franchise history to have consecutive 1,000-yard receiving seasons.

2022 season
On April 7, 2022, despite multiple trade rumors, Cooks signed a two-year contract extension with the Texans worth $39.6 million with $36 million guaranteed. Before Week 13, Cooks suffered a calf injury in practice and missed two games. In Week 18, against the Indianapolis Colts, he had five receptions for 106 receiving yards and one touchdown in the 32–31 victory. Cooks played in 13 games in the 2022 season. He finished with 57 receptions for 699 receiving yards and three receiving touchdowns as the Texans went 3–13–1. He led the team in receptions and receiving yards.

Dallas Cowboys

On March 19, 2023, Cooks was traded to the Dallas Cowboys in exchange for a fifth-round pick in 2023 and a sixth-round pick in 2024.

NFL career statistics

Regular season

Postseason

NFL records
 First player in NFL history with 1,000 receiving yards in three consecutive seasons with three different teams
 1,000-yard receiving season with four different teams: 4 (tied with Brandon Marshall)

Rams franchise records
 Most games in a single postseason with at least 100 receiving yards: 2 (in 2018) (tied with Isaac Bruce, Kevin Curtis, Tom Fears, and Cooper Kupp)
 Most targets in a Super Bowl: 13 (in Super Bowl LIII)

Saints franchise records
 Longest touchdown reception: 98 yards

Personal life
Cooks is a Christian. He followed big plays in the 2016 season with a bow-and-arrow motion, referencing a Bible verse in which a boy named Ishmael used his archery skills to survive in the desert after he nearly died there without water. Cooks earned a nickname as "The Archer".

Cooks married Briannon Lepman on July 7, 2018.

In 2020, Cooks donated $50,000 to his hometown of Stockton, California. The donation helped establish the Stockton's Children's Fund, which serves local children impacted by the coronavirus pandemic.

See also
 List of Fred Biletnikoff Award winners
 List of NCAA major college football yearly receiving leaders
 List of New Orleans Saints first-round draft picks

References

External links

 Houston Texans bio
 Oregon State Beavers bio

1993 births
Living people
Players of American football from Stockton, California
American football wide receivers
American football return specialists
Oregon State Beavers men's track and field athletes
Oregon State Beavers football players
All-American college football players
New Orleans Saints players
New England Patriots players
Los Angeles Rams players
Houston Texans players
Dallas Cowboys players